Indianapolis is served by 11 public school districts, along with a number of public charter and private schools. Indianapolis also has eight local universities.

Colleges and universities

Ball State University College of Architecture and Planning‡
Butler University
Christian Theological Seminary
Crossroads Bible College
Indiana Bible College
Indiana Institute of Technology‡
Indiana University–Purdue University Indianapolis (IUPUI)
Herron School of Art and Design
Kelley School of Business
O'Neill School of Public and Environmental Affairs
Robert H. McKinney School of Law
Indiana University School of Dentistry
Indiana University School of Education
Indiana University School of Medicine
Indiana University School of Liberal Arts
Indiana Wesleyan University‡
Ivy Tech Community College of Indiana
Lincoln Tech‡
Marian University
Bishop Simon Bruté College Seminary
Marian University College of Osteopathic Medicine
Martin University
Purdue Polytechnic Institute‡
Rabbi Naftali Riff Yeshiva
University of Indianapolis
Vincennes University‡

The ‡ symbol denotes university branches whose main campuses are located outside of Indianapolis.

Public school systems

Indianapolis Public Schools

IPS, is the largest school district in Indianapolis with nearly 37,000 students. IPS operates four traditional high schools along with five community (grades 7 through 12) and magnet high schools. Emmerich Manual High School and Thomas Carr Howe Community High School are part of Charter School USA due to continuous failing school grade under IPS administration.

Arlington Community High School
Arsenal Technical High School
Crispus Attucks Medical Magnet High School
Emmerich Manual High School
George Washington Community High School
Northwest High School
Shortridge High School
Thomas Carr Howe Community High School

Beech Grove City Schools

Beech Grove City Schools is the public school district serving the city of Beech Grove, Indiana. The school district's current enrollment is 2,293 students.

Beech Grove High School

Decatur Township

The Metropolitan School District of Decatur Township is a public school district located in Decatur Township, Indianapolis, Indiana. The school district's current enrollment is 6,131 students.

Decatur Central High School

Franklin Township

Franklin Township Community School Corporation is a school district in Franklin Township, Indianapolis, Indiana, United States. The school district's current enrollment is 8,828 students.

Franklin Central High School

Lawrence Township

The Metropolitan School District of Lawrence Township is a public school district located in Lawrence Township, Indianapolis, Indiana. It has an enrollment of 16,153.

Lawrence Central High School
Lawrence North High School

Metropolitan School District of Perry Township

The Metropolitan School District of Perry Township is a public school district located in Perry Township, Indianapolis, Indiana. It has an enrollment of 14,272.

Perry Meridian High School
Southport High School

Metropolitan School District of Pike Township

The Metropolitan School District of Pike Township is a public school district located in Pike Township, Indianapolis, Indiana. It has an enrollment of 10,620.

Pike High School

Purdue Polytechnic High Schools 
PPHS Broad Ripple
PPHS Englewood

School Town of Speedway

School Town of Speedway is the public school district serving the town of Speedway, Indiana. The school district's current enrollment is 1,653 students.

Speedway Senior High School

Metropolitan School District of Warren Township

The Metropolitan School District of Warren Township is a public school district located in Warren Township, Indianapolis, Indiana. It has an enrollment of 12,503.

Warren Central High School

Metropolitan School District of Washington Township

The Metropolitan School District of Washington Township is a public school district located in Washington Township, Indianapolis, Indiana. It has an enrollment of 10,421.

North Central High School

Metropolitan School District of Wayne Township

The Metropolitan School District of Wayne Township is a public school district located in Wayne Township, Indianapolis, Indiana. It has an enrollment of 14,917.

Ben Davis High School

Public charter schools 

 Christel House Academy
 Charles A. Tindley Accelerated School
Circle City Prep
Herron High School
Hope Education Center
Indianapolis Metropolitan High School
Irvington Community School
KIPP Indy Public Schools
Riverside High School

Private schools
A Children's Habitat Montessori School
Acton Academy Northwest Indianapolis
Acts Christian Academy
Bishop Chatard High School
Brebeuf Jesuit Preparatory School
Cardinal Ritter High School
Cathedral High School
Covenant Christian High School
Heritage Christian School
International School of Indiana
Lutheran High School of Indianapolis
Park Tudor School
Providence Cristo Rey High School
Roncalli High School
Scecina Memorial High School
St. Richard's Episcopal School
Sycamore School
Westside Christian School of the Nazarene
Independence Academy of Indiana

Supplementary schools
Indiana Japanese Language School

Former schools
Key Learning Community

References

 
Indianapolis